Münch was a German motorcycle manufacturer which, during the 1960s, produced the Mammut, a four-cylinder motorcycle using an NSU car engine. 

Hugo Wilson wrote of the founder : 

Limited production began in 1966. The 'Mammut' name was never used officially as the "Maschinenfabrik Berner & Co" owned the copyright to the name after having used it in the interwar years. Münch's motorcycles were sold as "Münch TT" instead.

Early history
Friedel Münch began his career as a mechanic and engine tuner in the late 1940s, working especially with Horex motorcycles. The Horex factory noted the success of his home-tuned racers, and offered Münch a job in their competition department. 

When Horex ceased motorcycle manufacture in 1956, Friedel Münch purchased the remaining stocks of motorcycles and spares, and sold his own race-tuned Horex cafe racers from his workshop in Altenstadt, Germany.

Early Mammuts
Machines were hand-built to order from Münch's workshop in Nieder-Florstadt, Friedberg, West Germany.

Friedl Münch was given a commission in 1966 to build a special for Jean Murit, a famous French former sidecar road-racer, who was then-President of the BMW Club of France and organiser of the Chamois Rally, a summertime motorcyclists' gathering at high altitude in the Alps. 

Münch used a 996 cc air-cooled NSU Motorenwerke engine having a chain-driven single overhead camshaft housed in a specially-built, brazed-up steel tube frame based on Norton Featherbed principles. Customers could choose from one, two or four carburetors, with options for 43 or 52 bhp. A four-speed gearbox connected to a gear primary-drive and enclosed-chain final drive, and the front brake was one of Münch's famous  units. 

In July 1966, Murit rode his new bike at the head of a procession from the Val d’Isère up to Col de l'Iseran, Europe's second-highest mountain pass.

Production

In 1966 he created the Mammut, installing an NSU 996 cc overhead camshaft, 4 cylinder automobile engine with 55 hp into a tubular loop frame of his own construction. The machine weighed a reasonable 480 lbs, with a maximum speed of 115 mph – good for the era. The front brake was a massive  magnesium casting.

In 1968, Münch used the new 1177 cc NSU TTS car engine for a revised machine, which he called the Münch4 1200TTS. The new engine gave 88 hp, and the machine was prone to break the heavy-duty spokes on the rear wheel, so Münch developed a unique and much stronger cast magnesium rear wheel, while retaining a spoked wire wheel up front. The fuel tank and side panels were made of hand-hammered aluminum, while the seat, headlamp binnacle, wheels and brakes were magnesium. Despite the extensive use of lightweight materials, the Mammut weighed 650 lbs. American motorcycle entrepreneur Floyd Clymer invested in the Münch brand from 1968, marketing the bike in US as Clymer-Münch Mammoth IV with the slogan "Built up to a standard, not down to a price". Clymer died before serious production could commence.

The Münch, being a hand-built machine, was always expensive, and in 1969 sold for $3,995, while the BMW R69S sold for $1,695. Built to order after a $1,000 initial payment, the total price included duty, excise tax and air freight to any location in the United States. 

The 1200TTS model was originally fitted with a pair of Weber 40DCOE carburetors, but by 1973 Kugelfischer mechanical fuel injection was available (designated Model 1200 TTS-E – Einspritzer – the German word for injection), which gave 100 hp. 

It is estimated less than 500 machines were produced.

Notable Münch owners in the USA include Jay Leno and the late Malcolm Forbes (two, one of which he gave to Elizabeth Taylor). The 2010 French film Mammuth follows Gérard Dépardieu's character Serge Pilardosse on a journey through his past, riding a Münch "Mammut" 1200 TTS.  George Barber owns a 1972 Munch Mammut TTS and is on display at Barber Motorsports Museum in Leeds, Alabama.

Notes

References

 Winni Scheibe: Die Legende Friedel Münch und seine Motorräder, German/English, 176 pages, 21 x 32 cm, Festeinband, with about 160 colour photographs, about 40 Photos b/w. Rösrath: Art Motor Verlag 1995, .

See also
List of motorcycles by type of engine

External links

 Images of Münch machines under production 
 Winni Scheibe: Die Münch-Story, in: bma 01/04, accessed 13 October 2008 
 Friedel Münch Museum in Walldorf, accessed 6 April 2008
 muench-mammut-2000.com, accessed  April 2008
 DBH-Motorradtechnik aktueller Münch-4 Hersteller
Münch at Bonhams

Motorcycle manufacturers of Germany